National Highway 129 is a national highway of India. It connects Dimapur in Nagaland Numaligarh in Assam.

References
 

National highways in India
National Highways in Nagaland
National Highways in Assam